David M. Robinson (born May 27, 1965) is an American historian. He earned a bachelor's degree from Hobart College and completed graduate studies at Princeton University. He teaches at Colgate University as the Robert H.N. Ho Professor in Asian Studies.

References 

1965 births
Living people
American historians
American sinologists
Mongolists
Hobart and William Smith Colleges alumni
Princeton University alumni
Colgate University faculty